Ranunculus muricatus is a species of buttercup known by the common names rough-fruited buttercup and spinyfruit buttercup. It is native to Europe, but it can be found in many other places in the world, including parts of Africa, Australia, and the western and eastern United States, as an introduced species and agricultural and roadside weed. It grows in wet habitats, such as irrigation ditches. It is an annual or sometimes biennial herb producing a mostly hairless stem up to half a meter long which may grow erect or decumbent along the ground. The leaves have blades a few centimetres in length which are deeply divided into three lobes or split into three leaflets. They are hairless to hairy in texture, and are borne at the tips of long petioles. The fruit is a spiny achene borne in a spherical cluster of 10 to 20.

References

External links
Jepson Manual Treatment
Washington Burke Museum
Photo gallery

muricatus
Plants described in 1753
Taxa named by Carl Linnaeus
Flora of Malta